Indre Arna is a suburban village in the borough of Arna in the municipality of Bergen in Vestland county, Norway. While Indre Arna is relatively far from most of the city centre by road, there is an 8-minute train journey through the mountain Ulriken from Indre Arna to the city centre. Arna Church is located in the village.

Since 2013, Statistics Norway no longer tracked separate population statistics for Indre Arna, instead the village was incorporated into a larger urban area called Arna.

References

Villages in Vestland
Neighbourhoods of Bergen